Hei soturit (Finnish for "Hey Warriors") is the second studio album by the Finnish rock group Sielun Veljet. The CD release of the album is titled Hei soturit/Lapset, as it also includes the 1983 EP Lapset (Finnish for "The Children").

"Elintaso" was covered by Finnish rock group Aknestik on the 2002 various artists tribute album Säkenöivää voimaa - tribuutti Sielun Veljille. Ismo Alanko said in an interview that he prefers cover versions that try to find a new perspective to the original, and that the Aknestik version was even confusing because they had transformed the furious song into a ballad. Popeda covered "Aina Nälkä" on the same album.

Track listing 
All tracks by Sielun Veljet, except where noted.

 "Rytmi" (Alanko, Orma, Hohko, Forsman) -- 0:32
 "Satama" (Alanko) -- 3:57
 "Aina nälkä" (Alanko) -- 3:02
 "Hei soturit" (Alanko, Orma) -- 1:41
 "Ossin jälkeiset" (Hohko, Orma) -- 4:13
 "Tää on tää" (Alanko, Hohko) -- 2:43
 "Muistokirjoitus" (Alanko) -- 4:33
 "Vaanin sua" (Alanko) -- 3:37
 "Tango skitsofrenia" (Alanko, Orma) -- 2:52
 "Paljain jaloin" (Alanko, Orma, Hohko, Forsman) -- 2:35
 "Sielun veljet" (Alanko) -- 3:53
 "Rauhallista" (Alanko) -- 5:38

Personnel 
 Ismo Alanko -- vocals, guitar, bass, piano, cello
 Jukka Orma—guitar, vocals
 Jouko Hohko—bass, guitar, vocals
 Alf Forsman -- drums, percussion

References 

1984 albums
Sielun Veljet albums